Henry Albert Bauer (July 31, 1922 – February 9, 2007) was an American right fielder and manager in Major League Baseball. He played with the New York Yankees (–) and Kansas City Athletics (–); he batted and threw right-handed. He served as the manager of the Athletics in both Kansas City (–62) and in Oakland, as well as the Baltimore Orioles (–68), guiding the Orioles to the World Series title in 1966, a four-game sweep over the heavily favored Los Angeles Dodgers.  This represented the first World Series title in the franchise's history.

Early years
Born in East St. Louis, Illinois, as the youngest of nine children, Bauer was the son of an Austrian immigrant, a bartender who had earlier lost his leg in an aluminum mill. With little money coming into the home, Bauer was forced to wear clothes made out of old feed sacks, helping shape his hard-nosed approach to life. (It was said that his care-worn face "looked like a clenched fist".) While playing baseball and basketball at East St. Louis Central Catholic High School, Bauer suffered permanent damage to his nose, which was caused by an errant elbow from an opponent. Upon graduation in 1941, he was repairing furnaces in a beer-bottling plant when his brother Herman, a minor league player in the Chicago White Sox system, was able to get him a tryout that resulted in a contract with Oshkosh of the Class D Wisconsin State League.

World War II – Marine Corps
One month after the Japanese attack on Pearl Harbor, Bauer enlisted in the U.S. Marine Corps and served with the 4th Raider Battalion and G Company, 2nd Battalion, 4th Marines. While deployed to the Pacific Theater, Bauer contracted malaria on Guadalcanal, however he recovered from that well enough to earn 11 campaign ribbons, two Bronze Stars, two Purple Hearts (for being wounded in action) in 32 months of combat and the Navy Commendation Medal. Bauer was wounded his second time during the Battle of Okinawa, when he was a sergeant in command of a platoon of 64 Marines. Only six of the 64 Marines survived the Japanese counterattack, and Bauer was wounded by shrapnel in his thigh. His wounds were severe enough to send him back to the United States to recuperate.

After the war – minor league
Returning to East St. Louis, Bauer joined the local pipe fitter's union, and he stopped by the local bar where his brother Joe Bauer worked. Danny Menendez, a scout for the New York Yankees, decided to sign him for a tryout with the Yankees' farm team in Quincy, Illinois. The terms of his contract were $175 a month (with a $25 per month increase if he made the team) and a $250 bonus. Batting .300 at Quincy and with the team's top minor league unit, the Kansas City Blues, Bauer eventually made his debut with the Yankees in September .

Career as player, coach and manager

In his 14-season Major League Baseball career, Bauer had a .277 batting average with 164 home runs and 703 RBIs in 1,544 games played. He recorded a career .982 fielding percentage. Bauer played on seven World Series-winning New York Yankees teams and holds the World Series record for the longest hitting streak (17 games). Perhaps Bauer's most notable performance came in the sixth and final game of the 1951 World Series, where he hit a three-run triple. He also saved the game with a diving catch of a line drive off the bat of Sal Yvars for the final out.

At the close of the 1959 season, Bauer was traded by the Yankees to the Kansas City Athletics in the trade which brought them the future home run king Roger Maris (1961). This deal is often cited among the worst examples of the numerous trades between the Yankees and the Athletics during the late 1950s – trades which were nearly always one-sided in favor of the Yankees. In 1961, Athletics manager Joe Gordon chose to start Leo Posada over Bauer in the Opening Day starting lineup. On June 19, the Athletics fired Gordon and Bauer was named as the playing-manager of the Athletics. Bauer retired as a player one month later. In his first stint as the Athletics' manager, through the end of the 1962 season, the Athletics won 107 games and lost 157 (0.405), and his teams finished ninth in the ten-team American League twice.

After his firing at the close of the 1962 campaign, Bauer spent the 1963 season as first-base coach of the Baltimore Orioles. He was promoted to manager on November 19, 1963, succeeding Billy Hitchcock who had been dismissed 51 days earlier. Baltimore contended aggressively for the 1964 American League pennant, finishing third, and then—bolstered by the acquisition of future Hall of Fame outfielder Frank Robinson—its first AL pennant and World Series championship in 1966. However, the ballclub, hampered by an injury to Robinson and major off-years by a number of regulars and pitchers, finished in the second division in 1967. When the Orioles entered the 1968 All-Star break in third place and  games behind the eventual World Series champion Detroit Tigers, Bauer was dismissed on July 10 in favor of first-base coach Earl Weaver.

Bauer then returned to the Athletics, now based in Oakland, for the 1969 campaign. He was fired for the second and final time by Finley after bringing Oakland home second in the new American League West Division. Overall, his regular-season managerial record was 594–544 (0.522). Bauer managed the Tidewater Tides, the AAA affiliate of the New York Mets, in 1971–72. The Tides made the finals of IL Governors' Cup playoffs each season, winning the playoff title in the latter campaign. Bauer then hung up his uniform, returning home to the Kansas City area, where he scouted with the Yankees and the Kansas City Royals.

Managerial record

Personal life
Bauer moved to the Kansas City area Prairie Village, Kansas, in 1949 after playing with the Blues of 1947 and 1948. While there, he met and later married Charlene Friede, the club's office secretary. She died in July 1999.

The family's children attended St. Ann's Grade School in Prairie Village, then Bishop Miege High School in Shawnee Mission.

Hank owned and managed a liquor store in Prairie Village for a number of years after retirement from baseball.

Bauer died in his home on February 9, 2007, at the age of 84 from lung cancer.

Highlights
October, 10, : Bauer's bases-loaded triple lead the Yankees to 4–3 win over the New York Giants to clinch the 1951 World Series.
Three-time American League All-Star (1952–54).
From 1956–1958, Bauer set a World Series hitting streak record of 17 games in a row, which was later matched as a post-season batting record by Derek Jeter, also of the Yankees.
Bauer led the American League in triples (nine) in 1957.
Bauer appeared on the cover of the September 11, 1964 issue of Time magazine.

Quotes
 "Hank crawled on top of the Yankee dugout and searched the stands, looking for a fan who was shouting racial slurs at Elston Howard. When asked about the incident, Bauer explained simply, 'Ellie's my friend. —Excerpt from the book Clubhouse Lawyer, by Art Ditmar, former major league pitcher
 "Hank lost four prime years from his playing career due to his Marine service. This is heavy duty when you figure such a career is usually over when a player reaches his mid-thirties. This is something that does not bother Hank. 'I guess I knew too many great young guys who lost everything out there to worry about my losing part of a baseball career', he says."
 Tommy Lasorda on Bauer: "This guy's tough. He had a face that looked like it'd hold two days of rain."
 Bauer was a no-nonsense leader and could be unforgiving if he felt his teammates' off-the-field activities were hurting the Yankees' on-the-field performance. Pitcher Whitey Ford remembered how Bauer reacted when he thought players like Ford and Mantle were overindulging after hours: "He pinned me to the wall of the dugout one day and said, 'Don't mess with my money'." New York Times, obituary, February 10, 2007.

See also

List of famous U.S. Marines
List of Major League Baseball annual triples leaders
List of Major League Baseball player-managers

References

External links

Hank Bauer at SABR (Baseball BioProject)
Kansas City Star obituary
Hank Bauer – Time cover, September 11, 1964.
"Old Potato Face" (cover story), Time, September 11, 1964.

1922 births
2007 deaths
American League All-Stars
United States Marine Corps personnel of World War II
United States Marines
American people of Austrian descent
Baltimore Orioles coaches
Baltimore Orioles managers
Baseball players from Illinois
Deaths from lung cancer in Kansas
Kansas City Athletics managers
Kansas City Athletics players
Kansas City Royals scouts
Major League Baseball first base coaches
Major League Baseball player-managers
Major League Baseball right fielders
New York Yankees players
New York Yankees scouts
Norfolk Tides managers
Oakland Athletics managers
Sportspeople from East St. Louis, Illinois
People from Prairie Village, Kansas
World Series-winning managers